Under the Pink is the second studio album by singer-songwriter Tori Amos. Upon its release in January 1994, the album debuted atop the UK Albums Chart on the back of the hit single "Cornflake Girl", and peaked at number 12 in the US.

The album was certified double Platinum in the US by the RIAA in October 1999, for sales exceeding 2 million copies. It was the 61st highest-selling album of 1994 in the UK and was certified platinum by the BPI in February 2007, for sales exceeding 300,000 copies.

Under the Pink was included in Blender magazine's list of 500 CDs You Must Own, and was voted among the greatest albums of the 1990s by Rolling Stone magazine some years later.  A special double-disc tour edition was released exclusively in Australia and New Zealand in November 1994, titled More Pink: The B-Sides.

Background
On Tori Amos' second solo album, the singer-songwriter continued to offer piano-driven rock songs dealing with religion, gender, and sexuality. In addition to featuring more cryptic lyrics and experimental song structures, Amos invited in reggae influences on the single "Cornflake Girl", prepared piano on "Bells for Her" by John Philip Shenale, and Debussy-inspired piano lines on "Yes, Anastasia".

Amos performed the Under the Pink tour from February through November 1994, encompassing many of the same stops as on the previous world tour. A limited edition release of the album commemorating the Australian tour included a second disc entitled More Pink, a collection of rare B-sides like "Little Drummer Boy" and a cover version of Joni Mitchell's "A Case of You", was issued in November 1994. During this period, she also contributed the song "Butterfly" to the soundtrack for the 1994 movie Higher Learning, as well as a cover of the R.E.M. song "Losing My Religion".

The original track listing included the B-side "Honey", which was left off the album at the last minute. Amos has since voiced great regret for this:
"There were certain songs that were supposed to be on the record that got kicked off. 'Honey' was supposed to be on the record and, in retrospect, I wish it had been. I kicked it off for 'The Wrong Band'. Under the Pink wept when 'Honey' wasn't on, and she still is angry with me about it." Amos made a similar reference to the song "Here. In My Head" which was originally featured as a B-side to the UK single of "Crucify".

The album was recorded in Taos, New Mexico in a hacienda. The album artwork features several Native American and New Mexican references in the photography. The album is also notable as the last Amos album to feature the production of Eric Rosse as they split that year.

Singles
Under the Pink produced four singles. "Cornflake Girl" was released as the first single from the album in Europe (January 1994) and Australia (February 1994), and as the second single in North America (May 1994). It became Amos's biggest international hit at the time, peaking at number 4 in the UK. "God" was released as the first single in North America in February 1994, where it became her first Billboard Hot 100 chart entry, peaking at number 72. "God" was released as the second single from the album in Australia in May 1994, and as the fourth single in Europe in October 1994. "Pretty Good Year" was released as the second single in Europe in March 1994 and the fourth single in Australia in November 1994, but was not released as a single in North America. "Past the Mission", featuring backing vocals from Trent Reznor of Nine Inch Nails, was the third single from the album in all territories, released in Europe in May 1994, Australia in July 1994, and North America in September 1994.

B-sides
European pressings of the "Cornflake Girl" CD single, and the US pressing of the "God" CD single, contained the B-sides "All the Girls Hate Her" and "Over It".  "Sister Janet" appeared on both the European and US pressing of the "Cornflake Girl" single, and a B-side of the US cassette single for "God", while the US CD single of "God" also contained "Home on the Range – Cherokee Edition".  The US "Cornflake Girl" CD single, which had different artwork to international pressings, contained a radio edit of the title track, plus the songs "Daisy Dead Petals" and "Honey". A limited edition second CD single for "Cornflake Girl" was issued in the UK, containing cover versions of Joni Mitchell's "A Case of You", Jimi Hendrix's "If 6 Was 9", and Billie Holiday's "Strange Fruit".

Part one of the UK CD single "Pretty Good Year" contained the B-sides "Home on the Range – Cherokee Edition" and "Daisy Dead Petals".  The latter track was used as a B-side on the US pressing of "Cornflake Girl".  "Honey" and "Black Swan" appeared as B-sides on part two of the UK "Pretty Good Year" CD single.

Seven live tracks were spread across a two-part CD single release for "Past the Mission" in the UK.  Live versions of "Upside Down", "Past the Mission", "Icicle" and "Flying Dutchman" appeared on the limited edition part one disc, and live versions of "Winter", "The Waitress" and "Here. In My Head" appeared on part two.

The UK release of "God" contained several remixes of the title track.

Track listing

More Pink: The B-Sides
The double-disc version of Under the Pink was released on November 14, 1994 by East West to coincide with Amos's tour of Australia and New Zealand. The second disc, titled More Pink: The B-Sides was never released separately, and is a rarity amongst Tori Amos collectibles. Amos would not release another collection of B-sides until 2006's A Piano: The Collection.

The packaging simply inserted the normal Australian release of Under the Pink in a double jewel case, and altered the back insert artwork so that instead of being blank it featured the track listing of the second disc as well as production information for the songs. The title More Pink may be misleading, as many of the B-sides on the disc did not come from Under the Pink singles but in fact from the 1992 album Little Earthquakes, and in one case, from a Christmas compilation. The length of this disc is 48:49.

The double-disc set entered the Australian ARIA Charts Top 100 Albums chart on the week ending December 11, 1994, peaking at number 44 and spending 6 weeks on the chart. However, it was listed on the chart as a re-entry of Under the Pink, with its weeks spent charting added to the 21-week tally achieved earlier by the album.

Track listing

All tracks written by Tori Amos, except "A Case of You" written by Joni Mitchell and "Little Drummer Boy" (traditional).

 "A Case of You" – 4:38 
 "Honey" – 3:47 
 "Daisy Dead Petals" – 3:02 
 "Sister Janet" – 4:02 
 "Sugar" – 4:27 
 "Take to the Sky" – 4:20 
 "Upside Down" – 4:22 
 "Flying Dutchman" – 6:31 
 "Here. In My Head" (Live) – 6:05 
 "Black Swan" – 4:04 
 "Little Drummer Boy" – 3:20

Personnel

Band
 Tori Amos – piano, vocals, producer; Vox organ on "Past the Mission"
 Steve Caton – guitar
 John Philip Shenale – strings, Hammond organ
 George Porter Jr. – bass
 Paulinho da Costa – percussion
 Carlo Nuccio – drums
 Trent Reznor – backing vocals

String section
 John Acevedo – viola
 Michael Allen Harrison – violin
 Melissa "Missy" Hasin – cello
 Ezra Killinger – violin
 Dane Little – cello
 Cynthia Morrow – viola
 Chris Reutinger – violin
 Jimbo Ross – viola
 Nancy Roth – violin
 Nancy Stein-Ross – cello
 Francine Walsh – violin
 John Wittenberg – violin

Production & art
 Paul McKenna – producer, engineer
 Eric Rosse – producer, engineer
 Ross Cullum – mixing
 Shaun DeFeo – assistant engineer
 John Fundi – assistant engineer
 John Beverly Jones – engineer
 Kevin Killen – mixing
 Julie Larson – production coordination
 Bob Ludwig – mastering
 Avril McIntosh – mixing assistant
 Cindy Palmano – art direction, photography
 Alan Reinl – design

Charts

Weekly charts

Year-end charts

Singles

Certifications

References

1994 albums
Tori Amos albums
Albums produced by Eric Rosse
Atlantic Records albums